The pink-throated becard (Pachyramphus minor) is a species of bird in the family Tityridae. It has traditionally been placed in Cotingidae or Tyrannidae, but evidence strongly suggest it is better placed in Tityridae, where it is now placed by the South American Classification Committee.
It is found in Bolivia, Brazil, Colombia, Ecuador, French Guiana, Guyana, Peru, Suriname, and Venezuela.

Description
The male is dusky brown with a dark pink throat.

Habitat
Its natural habitat is subtropical or tropical moist lowland forests.

References

pink-throated becard
Birds of the Amazon Basin
Birds of the Guianas
pink-throated becard
Birds of Brazil
Taxonomy articles created by Polbot
Taxa named by René Lesson